Never Been Better is the fourth studio album by English recording artist Olly Murs. It was released through Epic Records on 21 November 2014 in Ireland and 24 November in the United Kingdom.

Never Been Better peaked at number one on the UK Albums Chart making it his third consecutive number one album on the chart. The album has been certified platinum by the British Phonographic Industry. The album reached the top-ten in Ireland, the top-twenty in Switzerland, and top-forty positions in Australia, Austria, Denmark, Finland, Germany and Norway. Never Been Better received generally mixed reviews from music critics, some praising Murs' more serious tone, while others felt that the album was unspectacular and safe.

On 2 October 2015, Murs announced on his Twitter account that he would release a special edition of Never Been Better on 20 November 2015 and the first single would be called "Kiss Me". Like Right Place Right Time: Special Edition, this album will feature extra tracks and a tour DVD.

Background
In July 2013, Murs revealed that he had been back in the studio writing and recording new material for his fourth album, due to be released in Summer 2014. In February 2014, it was revealed that work had begun on his fourth studio album. He has been working with Wayne Hector, Claude Kelly, Steve Robson and Demi Lovato. On 28 September, Murs announced that the title of the album will be called Never Been Better and also announced the track list alongside it. The album was released on 24 November 2014.

Singles
"Wrapped Up" was released as the lead single from the album on 16 November 2014. The song peaked at #3 on the UK Singles Chart, which earned Murs another top five single.

"Up", which features vocals from Demi Lovato was released as the second single from the album on 4 January 2015. The single peaked at #4 on the UK Singles Chart and has since gone Platinum in the United Kingdom.

"Seasons" was released as the third single on 27 March 2015. The single made it to the top 40 of the UK Singles Chart.

"Beautiful to Me" was released as fourth single on 28 May 2015.  The song peaked at number 93 in the UK Singles Chart.

"Kiss Me" was released as the first single from the reissued special edition of the album on 9 October 2015.

"Stevie Knows" was released as the promotional single on 11 December 2015 from the album reissued special edition.

Critical reception

Reviews for Never Been Better were mixed. Writing for 4music.com, Jessica Lever gave the album a 4/5 score, while writing for The Telegraph, in a 2 out of 5 stars review, Neil McCormick wrote: "Unexpected collaborations only expose how ordinary the X Factor runner-up is." Dave Simpson of The Guardian was more charitable, and in a 3 of 5 stars review suggested "the acoustic ballad Let Me In (co-written with Paul Weller) is, by some distance, the best thing here." Less complimentary overall was Shaun Connors in Truckings regular music reviews, writing (in a 1 of 5 stars review), "Yet another album by yet another X-Factor also-ran... And one that came second to the most forgettable winner of all... I realise it's risking social ostracisation by anybody under 13 for expressing these views, but this is without doubt the most uninspired, tedious collective of pop pap I've heard all year".

Commercial performance
Never Been Better debuted at number one on the UK Albums Chart, selling 92,597 copies in its first week. It is Murs's third number one album after In Case You Didn't Know in 2011 and Right Place Right Time in 2012. As of March 2015, the album sold 886,000 copies.

Track listing

Notes

 signifies an additional producer
 signifies a vocal producer
 signifies Demi Lovato vocal producer
 signifies strings producer

Unwrapped EP
Unwrapped is a free live EP exclusive to Google Play. It was released on 12 December 2014.

Personnel 

Credits for the album adapted from AllMusic.

Vern Asbury – bass
John August – assistant engineer, background vocals
Simon Baggs – violin
Tom Barnes – drums, background vocals
Paulette Bayley – violin
Mark Berrow – violin
Chris Bishop – vocal engineer
Duck Blackwell – drum programming
Rachel Bolt – viola
Natalia Bonner – violin
Dan Book – vocal producer
John Bradbury – violin
Sarah Brandwood-spencer – violin
Karl Brazil – drums
Chris Briggs – A&R
Ian Burdge – celli
Gillon Cameron – violin
Paul Cassidy – viola
Emil Chakalov – violin
Simon Clarke – brass arrangement, alto saxophone, baritone saxophone
Ben Collier – programming, string programming
Maegan Cottone – background vocals
Tom Coyne – mastering
Cutfather – producer
Rosie Danvers – cello, string arrangements
Daniel Davidsen – bass,  drum programming, guitar, instrumentation, producer, programming
Alison Dods – violin
Ian Dowling – engineer
Jason Elliott – vocal engineer
Jason Evigan – engineer, horn arrangements, instrumentation, producer, programming, vocal producer
Fresh – beat box
Futurecut – additional production
Simon Gardner – brass, trumpet
Paul Gendler – guitar
Serban Ghenea – mixing
Susie Gillis – string contractor
Isobel Griffiths – string contractor
John Hanes – mixing
Mich Hansen – percussion
Peter Hanson – violin
Jacqueline Hartley – violin
Wayne Hector – background vocals
John Heley – celli
Richard Henry – trombone
George Hogg – trumpet
Kiris Houston – bass, guitar, organ, piano
Sally Jackson – violin
Bryony James – cello
Iain James – background vocals
Martin Johnson – engineer, guitars, instrumentation, percussion, piano, producer, programming, background vocals
Magnus Johnston – violin
Beverley Jones – double bass
Joe Kearns – engineer, vocal engineer
Paul Kegg – celli
Pete Kelleher – keyboards
Claude Kelly – background vocals
The Kick Horns – brass
Patrick Kiernan – strings, violin
Ben Kohn – guitar, percussion, background vocals
Boguslaw Kostecki – violin
Jan "Stan" Kybert – engineer
Peter Lale – viola
Oliver Langford – violin
Chris Laws – drums, engineer, mixing
Julian Leaper – violin
Fiona Legget – viola
Anthony Lewis – celli
Vicki Lewis – string contractor
David Liddell – trombone
Ryan Lipman – mixing assistant
Demi Lovato – featured artist
Martin Loveday – celli
Jacob Luttrell – background vocals
Steve Mac – brass arrangement,  keyboards, producer, string arrangements
Wil Malone – string arrangements, string conductor
Travie McCoy – featured artist
Jim McLeod – violin
Sam Miller – engineer
Perry Montague-Mason – leader, strings, violin
Kyle Moorman – additional production, engineer, programming
Steve Morris – violin
Olly Murs – primary artist, lead vocals
Everton Nelson – violin
John Newman – background vocals
Serge Nudel – engineer
Emma Owens – viola
Brandon Paddock – additional production, bass, engineer, programming, background vocals
Kerenza Peacock – violin
Daniel Pierce – background vocals
Mike Posner – piano
Luke Potashnick – guitar
Dann Pursey – engineer, mixing assistant, percussion
David "DQ" Quinones – vocal producer
Charles Rees – engineer
Jonathan Rees – violin
Tom Rees-roberts – Brass
Alex Reeve – guitar
Rich Rich III – assistant engineer, vocal editing
Pierre-Luc Rioux – Guitar
Steve Robson – instrumentation, mixing, producer, string arrangements
Jenny Sacha – violin
Tim Sanders – brass arrangement, tenor saxophone
Frank Schaefer – celli
Jamie Scott – piano
Mary Scully – bass, double bass
Nick Seeley – horn arrangements, strings
Jackie Shave – violin
Emlyn Singleton – violin
Chris Stereo:Type – vocal engineer
Nick Taylor – engineer
Ryan Tedder – instrumentation, producer, programming, vocal engineer, background vocals
Issaiah Tejada – assistant engineer
TMS – producer
Christopher Tombling – violin
Tommy D. – producer
Matthew Tryba – assistant engineer
Nick Trygstad – cello
Yu Tsai – photography
Simon Turner – cello
David Venni – photography
Peter Wallevik – drum programming, instrumentation, keyboards, piano, producer, programming, background vocals
Allen Walley – bass, double bass
Leah Weller – background vocals
Paul Weller – guitar, piano, producer, background vocals
Jeremy Wheatley – mixing
Bruce White – viola
Pete Whitfield – transcription, violin
Deborah Widdup – violin
Josh Wilkinson – programming
The Wired Strings – strings
David Woodcock – violin
Chris Worsey – celli
Steve Wright – viola
Noel Zancanella – instrumentation, producer, programming
Joe Zook – mixing

Charts and certifications

Weekly charts

Year-end charts

Decade-end charts

Certifications

Never Been Better: Special Edition

Never Been Better: (Special Edition) is a reissue of the album. It was released on 20 November 2015, through Epic Records and Syco Music. Never Been Better (Special Edition) features seven new tracks and a DVD, Olly Murs: Never Been Better Tour.

Track listing

References

2014 albums
Olly Murs albums
Albums produced by Cutfather
Albums produced by Ryan Tedder
Syco Music albums
Epic Records albums